General Buchanan may refer to:

Ferdinand Buchanan (1888–1967), South African Army general
Henry Buchanan (British Army officer) (1830–1903), British Army lieutenant general
Jeffrey S. Buchanan (fl. 1980s–2010s), U.S. Army lieutenant general
Kenneth Buchanan (1880–1973), British Army major general
Robert C. Buchanan (1811–1878), U.S. Army brevet major general